The 2023 Campeonato da Primeira Divisão de Futebol Profissional da FGF - Divisão Especial - Série A1, better known as the 2023 Campeonato Gaúcho (officially the Gauchão Ipiranga 2023 for sponsorship reasons), will be the 103rd season of Rio Grande do Sul's top flight football league. The competition will be played from 21 January to 9 April 2023. 12 clubs contested in the Campeonato Gaúcho. Grêmio were the fifth-time defending champion.

Teams
A total of 12 teams competed in the 2023 Série A1 season.

Personnel

First stage

Table

Results

Positions by matchday
The table lists the positions of teams after each matchday.

Knockout stage

Semi-finals
The first legs will be played on 18–19 March, and the second legs will be played on 25–26 March 2023.

|}

Match C1

Winner of Semi-final 1 advances to the finals.

Match C2

Winner of Semi-final 2 advances to the finals.

Finals
The first legs will be played on 2 April, and the second legs will be played on 9 April 2023.

|}

Match G1

First leg

Second leg

Statistics

Top scorers

References

Campeonato Gaúcho seasons
Gaúcho
2023 in Brazilian football